NYH may refer to:

 New York Herald, a newspaper, 1835-1924
 Station code for Nayandahalli Railway Station